Acrobasis juglandis, the pecan leaf casebearer, is a moth of the family Pyralidae. It is found in Ontario, from Vermont south to Florida and from North Dakota to New Mexico.

Its wingspan is about 18 mm.

The larva feeds on Carya illinoensis, Juglans nigra, Juglans cinerea and Juglans microcarpa.

References

Moths described in 1872
Acrobasis
Moths of North America